Antipathella is a genus of cnidarians belonging to the family Myriopathidae.

The genus has almost cosmopolitan distribution.

Species:

Antipathella aperta 
Antipathella fiordensis 
Antipathella strigosa 
Antipathella subpinnata 
Antipathella wollastoni

References

Myriopathidae
Hexacorallia genera